The Cold Spring Harbor Fish Hatchery & Aquarium is a non-profit environmental education center dedicated to educating its visitors about the freshwater ecosystems of New York State. It was founded in 1883 in Cold Spring Harbor, New York as a state trout hatchery, and served in that capacity until 1982, when it was reopened as a non-profit educational center by the Friends of the Cold Spring Harbor Fish Hatchery, Inc. Facilities include two aquarium buildings that feature New York State freshwater reptiles, fish and amphibians, and eight outdoor ponds with trout in various stages of development, as well as some with local fish. Catch and keep trout fishing is available year-round.

Cold Spring Harbor Fish Hatchery and Aquarium offers environmental education programs for schools and groups and summer camp programs.

Notes

External links
 Cold Spring Harbor Fish Hatchery and Aquarium website

1883 establishments in New York (state)
Nature centers in New York (state)
Huntington, New York
Buildings and structures in Suffolk County, New York
Education in Suffolk County, New York
Fish hatcheries in the United States